Martial Mischler (born 6 July 1964) is a French former wrestler who competed in the 1984 Summer Olympics, in the 1988 Summer Olympics, and in the 1992 Summer Olympics.

References

External links
 

1964 births
Living people
Olympic wrestlers of France
Wrestlers at the 1984 Summer Olympics
Wrestlers at the 1988 Summer Olympics
Wrestlers at the 1992 Summer Olympics
French male sport wrestlers
20th-century French people